Walter Laing MacDonald Perry, Baron Perry of Walton, OBE, FRS, FRCP, FRSE (16 June 1921 – 17 July 2003) was a distinguished Scottish academic. He was the first Vice Chancellor of the Open University.

Life 
Perry was born in Dundee, son of Flora and Fletcher Perry, and educated at Ayr Academy, and the High School of Dundee. He studied medicine at the University of St Andrews graduating with an MB ChB in 1943, his MD in 1948 and a DSc in 1958.  Between 1944 and 1946 he worked as a Medical Officer in Nigeria. He later worked as a scientist for institutions like the Medical Research Council. In particular he became an expert on polio. He had a reputation for following the scientific method rigorously.

He developed his career at the University of Edinburgh as Professor of Pharmacology, later Dean of Medicine and Vice Principal. In 1969 he became Vice Chancellor of the Open University and made that university into an effective institution proving that sceptics had been wrong.  He was mainly responsible for deciding that the Open University would not compromise on academic standards – he was determined that its qualifications should be of equal academic value to non-distance learning universities. Perry worked further to develop distance learning through the United Nations.

Perry was appointed an Officer of the Order of the British Empire in the 1957 New Year Honours and was knighted in 1974.

He entered the House of Lords being created a life peer with the title Baron Perry of Walton, of Walton in the County of Buckinghamshire on 9 February 1979, later taking the SDP and Liberal Democrat whips, and served on the committee dealing with science and technology.  He kept working right up to his death in 2003.

Perry married Catherine Hilda Crawley in 1971. Her sister Mary married Alun Michael and her brother married Christine Crawley, Baroness Crawley.

A collection of Walter Perry's papers, containing work relating to the Open University, other distance education institutions and work for the House of Lords, are preserved in the Open University Archive.

References

External links
 Open University Library Perry papers
 John Daniel of UNESCO speech dedicated to Perry

1921 births
2003 deaths
People educated at the High School of Dundee
Alumni of the University of St Andrews
Academics of the University of Edinburgh
Fellows of the Royal Society
People associated with the Open University
Social Democratic Party (UK) politicians
Social Democratic Party (UK) life peers
Perry of Walton
People educated at Ayr Academy
Politicians from Dundee
People from Dundee
Life peers created by Elizabeth II